Asparagus krebsianus is a shrub of the Asparagus genus that is indigenous to rocky areas in South Africa.

Description
It has tuberous roots, and smooth, grey-green, scrambling-twining, sometimes zig-zagged stems. Stems and branches all have slightly darker spines.  
The leaves are small, linear or needle-like, slightly triangular in cross-section, and appear in tufts.

Related species
It is part of a group of similar and related African Asparagus species, including Asparagus aethiopicus, Asparagus confertus and Asparagus densiflorus.

References

krebsianus
Flora of the Cape Provinces
Creepers of South Africa
Renosterveld